The Ecuadorian War of Independence, part of the Spanish American wars of independence of the early 19th century, was fought from 1820 to 1822 between Spain and several South American armies over control of the Royal Audience of Quito, a Spanish colonial jurisdiction which later became the modern Republic of Ecuador. The war ended with the defeat of the Spanish forces at the Battle of Pichincha on May 24, 1822, which brought about the independence of all the lands of the Real Audiencia of Quito.

War

Beginning of the war
The military campaign for the independence of the territory now known as Ecuador began after nearly three hundred years of Spanish colonization. Ecuador's capital, Quito, was a city of around ten thousand inhabitants. There, on August 10, 1809, came one of the first calls in Latin America for independence from Spain, led by the city's criollos, including , Eugenio Espejo and Bishop .

The wars of independence in South America turned decisively against Spain: Simón Bolívar's victory at the Battle of Boyacá on August 7, 1819 had sealed the independence of the former Viceroyalty of New Granada. To the south, José de San Martín landex the Liberating Expedition of Peru on the Peruvian coast on September 8, 1820, which with the blockade of the ports of Callao and  Guayaquil by Lord Thomas Cochrane since September 1819, finally obtained the independence of the Viceroyalty of Perú, the center of Spanish power in South America. 

On October 9, 1820, the port city of Guayaquil, part of the Viceroyalty of Peru, proclaimed its independence after a brief and almost bloodless revolt against the local garrison. The leaders of the movement, Peruvian pro-independence officers from the colonial army led by colonel , second in command of the garrison, and Ecuadorian intellectuals and patriots summoned by José Joaquín de Olmedo, set up a Junta de Gobierno with a military force to defend the city and carry
the independence movement to the other provinces of the country.

News of Guayaquil's proclamation of independence spread rapidly to other cities in the Presidencia, and several quickly followed its example. Portoviejo declared its independence on October 18, 1820, and Cuenca—the economic center of the southern highlands—did the same on November 3, 1820.

Junta de Guayaquil on the offensive
The military unit raised and financed in Guayaquil was named  ("Division for the Protection of Quito"). It was to advance on the cities of Guaranda and Ambato in the central highlands, hoping to bring them into the independence movement, and cut all road communication between Quito and Guayaquil and Cuenca, forestalling any Royalist countermove from the north.

The division, under the command of Venezuelan colonels Luis Urdaneta and León Febres Cordero, ringleaders of the revolt in Guayaquil, advanced out of the coastal plain towards the highlands, and by November 7, was ready to march into the Andes mountains. On November 9, 1820 the first clash with a  Royalist force was a success, through a strategic mountain pass on the road from Guayaquil to Guaranda. This victory opened the way into the inter-Andean highlands, and the capture of Guaranda soon followed.
News of the presence of the patriot army in Guaranda had the intended effect: many of the towns in the highlands proclaimed their independence. Latacunga and Riobamba did so on November 11, and Ambato on November 12, 1820. By the middle of November, Spanish control of the Presidencia had been reduced to Quito and its surrounding areas in the northern highlands. It looked as if the liberation of the entire territory would be easier than expected.

Spain strikes back

Hopes for a quick victory were short-lived. Field-Marshal Melchor Aymerich, acting President and supreme commander of Royalist forces in Quito, sent around 5,000 troops south under veteran Spanish colonel Francisco González to deal with the 2,000-man patriot army in Ambato.

The guerrillas' commanding officer, Spanish-born colonel Gabriel García Gomez, taken prisoner, was executed by firing squad and decapitated, with his head sent to Quito to be displayed to the population.

Sucre arrivez 

Yet help was on the way. Even more welcome perhaps were the weapons Sucre brought with him: 1,000 muskets, 50,000 musket rounds, 8,000 flints, 500 sabers, and 100 pairs of pistols. Sucre's instructions were clear: "To liberate the capital city of Quito, whose taking will bring about the liberation of the whole Department", as the first step towards later securing the complete independence of Perú. Bolívar also informed the Junta de Guayaquil that they would begin a simultaneous campaign from both the north and south of Quito.

Second Battle of Huachi
In July 1821, Sucre was deploying his army in Babahoyo, ready to advance on the highlands as soon as the weather allowed. Aymerich acted to preempt him with a pincer movement: he would led his army from Guaranda down to Babahoyo, while Colonel González, came from the southern highlands down to Yaguachi to attack Sucre's flank. Thanks to a well-developed espionage network, Sucre was apprised of Aymerich's intentions, and sent General  to deal with González. The encounter ended with the destruction of Gonzalez's force near the town of Cone on August 19, 1821. Upon receiving word of the defeat, Aymerich headed back to the highlands. Sucre followed, his main force occupying Guaranda on September 2, 1821. 

The patriot forces lost 800 men, mostly killed, plus 50 prisoners, among them General Mires. As the battle had also taken a heavy toll on the Royalists, Aymerich decided against exploiting his victory by advancing into the coastal plains. On November 19, 1821, the parties signed a 90-day armistice at Babahoyo, ending Sucre's ill-fated first attempt to liberate Quito.

Battle of Pichincha

With Sucre's casualties, he was not going to be able to get the royalists out of Quito. But as promised by José de San Martín, reinforcements from Peru  helped Guayaquil, a Peruvian division of 1,500 men, including three cavalry squadrons and one artillery regiment under Alto-Peruvian Colonel Andrés de Santa Cruz departed from Paita and Trujillo in December 1821.

With these reinforcements Sucre began a new campaign in January 1822 to completely remove the royalist forces from the provinces of Quito and Guayaquil.

See also

Military career of Simón Bolívar

References

Sources

1820 in Ecuador
1821 in Ecuador
1822 in Ecuador
1820s in the Spanish Empire
19th century in Ecuador
Conflicts in 1820
Conflicts in 1821
Conflicts in 1822
History of Ecuador
Independence
Spanish American wars of independence